Netsky is the eponymous debut album from Belgian drum and bass musician Netsky. The album primarily features drum and bass tracks, with various vocalists such as Darrison and Jenna G. It was leaked in early May, a month before the intended mid-June release. The release, however, was brought forward to 31 May 2010.

Track listing

Sample credits
 "Mellow" contains samples of "Have You Ever", written and performed by Shahin Moshirian, Michael Simon and Stephan Browarczyk.
 "Endless Search" contains samples of "Don't Give Up" written by Cybil Lynch, Sean Stafford Spencer, Gary C. Hudgins, Gary Ahrens and Thomas Davis and performed by Sybil.

Chart performance

Year-end charts

References

2010 debut albums
Netsky (musician) albums
Hospital Records albums